Veys District is a district (bakhsh) in Bavi County, Khuzestan Province, Iran. At the 2006 census, its population was 37,346, in 6,394 families.  The district has one city: Veys.  The district has one rural district (dehestan): Veys Rural District.

References 

Bavi County
Districts of Khuzestan Province